Ahmad Abdul-Jabar (born 8 January 1978) is an Iraqi former Iraq national football team football player who is currently manager of Al-Karkh SC. 

Ahmad, known as Al-Alemane ('The German') by his teammates, due to his fair skin and hair. He bore a slight resemblance to Brazilian Juninho of Middlesbrough and Atletico Madrid.

The qualified engineer also had the diminutive Brazilian's same penchant for taking on defenders with mazey runs and is often employed to support the front two. In 1996, he moved to Al-Zawraa from Al-Karkh, a club he joined at the age of 11 and flourished under coaches Amer Jamil and then Adnan Hamad.

It was Hamad who encouraged him to use his imagination more on the field, by thinking of himself as a fox; cunning and clever.

Manager career 
Ahmad started his coaching career by becoming the assistant for Abbas Attiya at the start of the season 2018–2019, then led the team for a while after the leaving of Attiya. Ahmad then also became the assistant of Mudhafar Jabbar Tawfik in the same season. After leaving of Tawfik, Ahmad came back again and led the team with a great and massive win over Naft Maysan FC in Maysan Stadium, which led to the appointment of him as the head coach on 3 February 2019.

Managerial statistics

Honours

Player

Club
Al-Zawraa
 Iraqi Premier League: 1998–99, 1999–2000, 2000–01, 2005–06, 2010–11
 Iraq FA Cup: 1997–98, 1998–99, 1999–2000
 Iraqi Elite Cup: 1999
 Iraqi Super Cup: 1998, 1999, 2000

International
 WAFF Championship: 2002

As A Manager
Al-Karkh
 Iraq FA Cup: 2021–22

References

External links

 

Iraqi footballers
Iraq international footballers
Iraqi expatriate footballers
Living people
Al-Zawraa SC players
1978 births
Al-Karkh SC players
Al-Shamal SC players
Al-Yarmouk FC (Jordan) players
Duhok SC players
amanat Baghdad players
zakho FC players
2000 AFC Asian Cup players
Association football midfielders
Al-Karkh SC managers